Plaxiphora boydeni is a small uncommon chiton in the family Mopaliidae, endemic to the East Coast of the South Island, New Zealand, Stewart Island and the Chatham and Subantarctic Islands.

Description and habitat
A flat oval chiton with a nondescript appearance and no distinct markings on the often eroded valves apart from the occasional white blotch. Girdle narrow, cream to mid-brown, also with occasional white blotches, covered in nodules. Usually attached to open rock surfaces on wave-exposed shores in the mid to low intertidal zone.

References

Mopaliidae
Chitons of New Zealand
Molluscs described in 1982